Okkar Min Maung (born Ye Htoo Win on 18 September 1985) is a Burmese actor, model, singer and male pageant winner who was crowned Mr. Tourism International 2016 in Manila, the Philippines.

He has starred in leading roles in a slew of local productions, from commercials to films, and has catwalked for several fashion events.

Early life and education
Okkar was born on 18 September 1985 in Yangon, Myanmar 
to parents Khine Win and Nilar Thein Myint and moved to New York when he was 24. He graduated in English from a Myanmar university and has another degree in Business Administration Management from Berkeley College.

Career
Okkar started his acting career at age 18 and has starred in over 40 films. He modeled for fashion shows, numerous magazines, and billboards until 2008.  After an eight-year gap in his acting career, he returned to the movie industry with Burma's first LGBT film, The Gemini, where he played in the leading role as Thit Wai in 2016.

In 2016, he won a Mister Tourism World Myanmar 2016 and represented Myanmar at the Mister Tourism World 2016, an international male beauty pageant.

On 10 December 2016, he competed in Mister Tourism World 2016 which was held in Manila, Philippines. At the end of the event, he became the winner and also won three continental titles for Social Media Icon, Best in Style & Fashion, and Best in Tourism Speaker.

Personal life
In 2018, Okkar came out as gay on his Facebook account.

Filmography

Film

 Over 40 films

Film (Big Screen Movies)

References

External links

1985 births
21st-century Burmese male actors
Burmese male film actors
Burmese male models
21st-century Burmese male singers
Gay actors
Gay models
Gay musicians
Burmese LGBT people
LGBT singers
Living people
20th-century LGBT people
21st-century LGBT people